Armenian–Azerbaijani war may refer to:

 the Armenian–Azerbaijani war (1918–1920)
 the Nagorno-Karabakh conflict, primarily:
 the First Nagorno-Karabakh War (1988–1994)
 the Four-Day War (2016)
 the Second Nagorno-Karabakh War (2020)

Other conflicts this may refer to 
 the 2008 Mardakert clashes
 the February 2010 Nagorno-Karabakh clashes
 the June–September 2010 Mardakert clashes
 the 2012 Armenian–Azerbaijani border clashes
 the 2014 Armenian–Azerbaijani clashes
 the 2016 Nagorno-Karabakh conflict (also called the Four-Day War)
 the 2018 Armenian–Azerbaijani clashes
 the July 2020 Armenian–Azerbaijani clashes
 the 2021–2023 Armenia–Azerbaijan border crisis
 September 2022 Armenia–Azerbaijan clashes

See also 
 Nagorno-Karabakh war (disambiguation)